Crowden railway station is a closed railway station on the Woodhead Line between Manchester and Sheffield, that served the hamlet of Crowden, Derbyshire between 1861 and 1957.

History 
At the start of 1847, the SA&MR amalgamated with other companies to form the Manchester, Sheffield and Lincolnshire Railway (MS&LR). On 1 August 1897, the MS&LR was renamed the Great Central Railway and this was merged with other railways to form the London and North Eastern Railway on 1 January 1923.

Operation 
A local millowner, Brown & Co., donated £50 towards the cost of providing a station at Crowden. Plans were drawn up in April 1857, but the MS&LR decided that the sum of £400 was too much and dropped the idea; however, they did not return the donation. When Brown & Co. complained in May 1860 about their loss, the plan was revived and the station was built, with the MS&LR meeting the balance of the £450 total cost. George Benton of Glossop was contracted for the building work, but the necessary road improvements were provided by Manchester Corporation; the station being adjacent to the dam at the lower end of the Woodhead Reservoir, which belonged to Manchester Corporation. The station was opened on 1 July 1861.

Closure 
The station was closed on 4 February 1957  but passenger trains continued to pass through the station until January 1970. The station continued to see freight trains travel through until July 1981, when the line between Hadfield and Penistone was closed completely.

References

External links

Disused railway stations in Derbyshire
Former Great Central Railway stations
Railway stations in Great Britain opened in 1861
Railway stations in Great Britain closed in 1957
1861 establishments in England